Mochianwala Mohra is a town in the Islamabad Capital Territory of Pakistan. It is located at 33° 24' 35N 73° 25' 35E with an altitude of  522 metres (1715 feet).

References 

Union councils of Islamabad Capital Territory